Armed to the Teeth may refer to:

 Armed to the Teeth (Abandoned Pools album), 2005
 Armed to the Teeth (Swollen Members album), 2009